John George "Jack" Leyfield (5 August 1923 – 21 December 2014) was an English professional footballer who played as a wing-half. He made appearances in the English Football League with Wrexham and Southport. He also guested during the Second World War with Chester City.

References

1923 births
2014 deaths
English footballers
Association football wing halves
Wrexham A.F.C. players
Southport F.C. players
Winsford United F.C. players
Chester City F.C. wartime guest players
English Football League players